Jay Taverner is the pseudonym for the writing partnership of Jacky Bratton and Jane Traies. The pair were a long-established lesbian partnership who met as undergraduates at St Anne's College, Oxford in 1963.

Their series of books deals with historical lesbian characters.

Bratton went on to an academic career at the University of London, publishing on nineteenth-century popular culture and latterly concentrating on performance; she is now Research Professor in Theatre and Cultural History at Royal Holloway, University of London.

In 2014, Traies finished a PhD at the University of Sussex looking at the lives of older lesbians in Britain.

Publications
 Rebellion (Onlywomen Press 1997)
 Hearts and Minds (Diva Books 2001)
 Something Wicked (Onlywomen Press 2002)

References

Pseudonymous women writers
Pseudonymous writers
Living people
British lesbian writers
Year of birth missing (living people)
20th-century pseudonymous writers
21st-century pseudonymous writers